Brian J. McLaughlin (born ca.1957) is a former member of the Boston City Council, having held the District 9 seat from 1984 through 1995.

Career
McLaughlin graduated from Stonehill College in Easton, Massachusetts, and before running for office was a community organizer, mainly on housing issues.

McLaughlin was first elected to the City Council in November 1983, representing District 9 (Allston–Brighton). He was subsequently re-elected five times, each term being for two years. His November 1987 victory was quite narrow; after finishing second in the preliminary election, McLaughlin won the general election by only 121 votes (4,627 to 4,506), with a recount later confirming his win. His November 1993 re-election also had to be confirmed by a recount. During his time on the council, McLaughlin was a strong advocate of rent control.

In March 1995, McLaughlin announced that he would not seek re-election. He later became executive secretary of the Boston Parks and Recreation Commission.

See also
 Boston City Council election, 1983
 Boston City Council election, 1985
 Boston City Council election, 1987
 Boston City Council election, 1989
 Boston City Council election, 1991
 Boston City Council election, 1993

References

External links
 McLaughlin election records at ourcampaigns.com

Living people
20th century in Boston
20th-century American politicians
Boston City Council members
Stonehill College alumni
1950s births
People from Allston–Brighton